Vaksali (Estonian for "Station") is a neighbourhood of Tartu, Estonia.

See also
Tartu railway station

References

Tartu